"Intuition" is a song by Brit funk band Linx, released in February 1981 as the third single from their debut album of the same name. It became their highest charting single, peaking at number 7 on the UK Singles Chart.

Reception 
Reviewing the song for Record Mirror, Mark Total wrote "A classic 12" slice of sophisticated funk that I'm proud to say is totally BRITISH. It is as original as it is danceable with an acoustic guitar adding extra texture to a solid bass and drum part. David Grant doesn't attempt to Americanise his voice but just sings soulfully".

Track listings 
7"

 "Intuition" – 3:20
 "Together We Can Shine" – 3:42

12"

 "Intuition" – 4:05
 "Together We Can Shine" – 5:38

Personnel 
 David Grant – lead vocals
 Peter 'Sketch' Martin – bass
 Bob Carter – keyboards
 Andy Duncan – drums
 Canute Edwards – guitar
 Chis Hunter – saxophone solo

Charts

References 

1981 singles
Chrysalis Records singles
1981 songs